Shatalovka is a rural locality (a selo) and the administrative center of Shatalovsky Selsoviet, Rodinsky District, Altai Krai, Russia. The population was 619 as of 2013. There are 8 streets.

Geography 
Shatalovka is located 22 km southwest of Rodino (the district's administrative centre) by road. Zelyony Lug is the nearest rural locality.

References 

Rural localities in Rodinsky District